Benjamin Kigen (born July 5, 1993) is a Kenyan athlete who competes primarily in the 3000 metres steeplechase. He won the bronze medal at the 2020 Tokyo Olympics. Kigen took gold at the 2019 All-Africa Games.

He is from Baringo County, Kenya and trains with Amos Kirui under coach Isaac Rono.

Kigen won the 3000 m steeplechase at the 2018 Prefontaine Classic, beating 2017 world champion Conseslus Kipruto and 2016 Olympic silver medalist Evan Jager with a 57.89 second last lap.

He qualified to represent Kenya at the 2020 Tokyo Olympics, where he won the bronze medal in his specialist event with a time of 8:11.45, behind Soufiane El Bakkali (8:08.90) and Lamecha Girma (8:10.38).

His personal best is 8:05.12 (Monaco 2019).

Achievements

International competitions

Circuit wins and titles, National championships
 Diamond League champion 3000 m steeplechase:  2021
 3000 metres steeplechase wins, other events specified in parenthesis
 2018: Eugene Prefontaine Classic, Rabat Meeting
 2019: Rome Golden Gala
 2021: Meeting de Paris, Zürich Weltklasse
 Kenyan Athletics Championships
 3000 m steeplechase: 2019

Personal bests
 800 metres – 1:57.51 (Nairobi 2021)
 1500 metres – 3:36.36 (Madrid 2017)
 3000 metres – 7:54.02 (Baie-Mahault 2018)
 5000 metres – 14:02.78 (Nairobi 2022)
 3000 metres steeplechase – 8:05.12 (Monaco 2019)

References

External links

 

Living people
1993 births
Kenyan male steeplechase runners
Athletes (track and field) at the 2019 African Games
African Games gold medalists for Kenya
African Games medalists in athletics (track and field)
People from Baringo County
African Games gold medalists in athletics (track and field)
Athletes (track and field) at the 2020 Summer Olympics
Medalists at the 2020 Summer Olympics
Olympic bronze medalists for Kenya
Olympic bronze medalists in athletics (track and field)
Olympic athletes of Kenya
Diamond League winners